The Point of Ayre Lighthouse is an active 19th century lighthouse, sited at the Point of Ayre at the north-eastern end of the Isle of Man. It was designed and built by Robert Stevenson, grandfather of prolific writer and novelist Robert Louis Stevenson, and was first lit in 1818, making it the oldest operational lighthouse on the island.

Description
The lighthouse still retains its original 1st order Fresnel lens from 1890, which was supplied by Barbier, Benard, et Turenne of Paris. Its light characteristic is made up of a pattern of four flashes of white light every twenty seconds. The tower has a distinctive daymark of two red bands, the light can be seen clearly from across the water in south-west Scotland.

Owing to the continuous accumulation of shingle and gravel deposited by the strong currents, a smaller light commonly referred to as a 'winkie' had to be built  to the seaward side of the main tower in 1899.  This was then repositioned a further  in the same direction and for the same reasons in 1950. The 'winkie' light was discontinued on 7 April 2010.

The lighthouse buildings and land have been in private ownership since 1993 when the light was fully automated. The light continues to be maintained by the Northern Lighthouse Board based in Edinburgh. In August, 2005, the fog signal at the lighthouse was decommissioned owing to the assumed reliance and availability of GPS and modern shipping guidance systems.

Gallery

See also

List of lighthouses in the Isle of Man
 List of Northern Lighthouse Board lighthouses

References

External links

Northern Lighthouse Board: Point of Ayre Lighthouse History
Northern Lighthouse Board: The Winkie Lighthouse History - archived

Lighthouses completed in 1818
Lighthouses completed in 1899
Lighthouses in the Isle of Man
1818 establishments in the British Empire
Works of Robert Stevenson (civil engineer)
Registered Buildings of the Isle of Man